Cheese Factories on the Moon: Why Earmarks are Good for American Democracy is a book by American political scientists Scott A. Frisch and Sean Q Kelly. The title of the book was inspired by a quote by conservative Republican and former Senator Phil Gramm, who said:

Originally published in 2011, the book focuses on congressional appropriations earmarks.

See also
The Moon is made of green cheese

References

American political books
Government finances in the United States